The Arsenal VG 90 was a French carrier-based jet-engined interceptor developed in the late 1940s. It was intended to compete for an Aéronavale (French Naval Aviation) contract and first flew in 1949. It set a speed record for a French aircraft the following year, but both of the completed prototypes were destroyed in fatal crashes and the program was cancelled in 1952 before the third prototype was finished. The Aéronavale contract was eventually awarded to a license-built British aircraft. The remains of the last VG 90 were scrapped in 1978.

Development and description
All of its aircraft were piston-engined and had been rendered obsolete by the advent of jet-propelled aircraft during the war. The French lacked an indigenous turbojet design and licensed the British Rolls-Royce Nene to facilitate their development of jet-propelled aircraft. Aéronavale issued a requirement for a jet-powered interceptor on 29 March 1946 and then issued a request for proposal on 8 June. Arsenal de l'Aéronautique's proposal was derived from its earlier VG 70 research aircraft and its related VG 80 carrier-based fighter proposal. The SNCAC NC 1080 and Nord 2200 were the other competitors for the contract for 90 aircraft.

The single-seat VG 90 had a semi-monocoque all-metal fuselage and was fitted with tricycle landing gear. The leading edge of the shoulder-mounted wing was swept back at an angle of 25° and the wing itself was given a dihedral of 4°. The skins of the wings and tailplane of the first prototype were made from birch plywood, but those of later prototypes were metal. Dive brakes were fitted on the upper and lower surfaces of the folding wings. Air for the license-built  Nene 102 engine was provided by side-mounted intakes below the wings' leading edge. The entire aft fuselage could be removed to allow access to the engine. The cockpit was armored and the pilot was provided with an ejection seat.

The VG 90's armament was intended to consist of three 30 mm Hispano-Suiza HS.602 autocannon mounted in the center portion of the wing, but Arsenal investigated replacing them with four or six  cannon. A radar was intended to be fitted in the nose and four hardpoints were going to be fitted under the center wing section for drop tanks, bombs or rockets.

Construction and flight testing
Design work on the first prototype began in October 1946 and construction began fifteen months later. The aircraft was completed in May 1949 and ground testing began the following month at Melun-Villaroche airfield, although it did not make its first flight until 27 September. This revealed problems with the air intake ducts and the ailerons and rectifying those issue delayed the next flight until December. On the third flight, the dive brakes unilaterally extended and their shape had to be modified to prevent a recurrence. Further flights were uneventful and the prototype was flown to Brétigny-sur-Orge to be evaluated by the test pilots of the Centre d'essais en vol ((CEV) French Flight-testing Center) on 10 May 1950. Initial evaluations were favorable although the pilots complained that forward visibility while landing was poor and that it was difficult to prevent the aft fuselage from striking the ground. Pilot Pierre Decroo was killed on 25 May while making a high-speed pass before coming in to land when pieces of the airframe broke away, causing the aircraft to roll seven times before ploughing into the ground. Flight-data instruments recorded about 15 violent oscillations. The crash investigation concluded that the dive brakes had again spontaneously opened and the high velocity caused them to be torn away, striking the tailplane and sending the aircraft out of control.

Work continued on the second prototype which had a larger vertical stabilizer with a split rudder, enlarged air intakes, modified landing gear, powered controls and a revised dive-brake installation. The aircraft made its first flight in June 1951. After the preliminary tests had been completed, pilot Claude Dellys flew the aircraft to begin its evaluation at CEV on 21 February 1952. It crashed en route after he reported experiencing some turbulence that was unnoticed by the chase plane. Dellys died in the crash because his ejection seat malfunctioned and did not fire because of frozen hydraulic fluid. The accident investigation concluded that the recent removal of some balancing weights in the horizontal stabilizers when the power controls were installed caused aerodynamic flutter that tore off the tail of the aircraft.

The third prototype was intended to be built to production standard as the first VG 91. The VG 90s had been found to be underpowered and the aircraft was to be fitted with a  SNECMA Atar 101C engine to improve upon their performance. It was also going to be equipped with a thinner wing and the intended armament installed. All further work was cancelled after the second crash and a license-built version of the British de Havilland Sea Venom was ultimately selected to satisfy Aéronavale's requirement. The incomplete aircraft was tested in the ONERA full-scale wind tunnel at Modane to discover the cause of the flutter. Many years later, it was discovered in the scrapyard at Cazaux Air Base, but could not be restored and was scrapped in July 1978.

Variants
VG 90
Carrier-based fighter with a Rolls-Royce Nene turbojet, two completed.
VG 91
Production version of the VG 90 with a SNECMA Atar 101 turbojet, one built, but not completed.
VG 92
Land-based version of the VG 90 without folding wings and arrestor hook, project only.
VG 93
VG 90 fitted with wingtip ramjets, project only.
VG 94
VG 92 fitted with an afterburner, project only.

Operators

Specifications

See also

Citations

References

Further reading

 

VG90
1940s French fighter aircraft
Single-engined jet aircraft
Carrier-based aircraft
Cancelled military aircraft projects of France